The commissure is the corner of the mouth, where the vermillion border of the superior labium (upper lip) meets that of the inferior labium (lower lip).

The commissure is important in facial appearance, particularly during some functions, including smiling. As such it is of interest to dental surgeons.

Diseases that involve the commissure include angular chelitis.

See also
 Commissure

Lips